Tukiainen is a Finnish surname.

Geographical distribution
As of 2014, 96.1% of all known bearers of the surname Tukiainen were residents of Finland (frequency 1:2,855), 1.2% of Sweden (1:410,282) and 1.1% of Estonia (1:57,464).

In Finland, the frequency of the surname was higher than national average (1:2,855) in the following regions:
 1. North Karelia (1:454)
 2. Northern Savonia (1:797)
 3. Southern Savonia (1:1,255)
 4. South Karelia (1:2,103)

People
 Eino Tukiainen (1915–1975), Finnish gymnast
 Antero Tukiainen (1916–1996), Finnish rower
 Aimo Tukiainen (1917–1996), Finnish sculptor
 Olli Tukiainen (born 1977), Finnish musician
 Katja Tukiainen (born 1969), Finnish visual artist and painter
 Johanna Tukiainen (born 1978), Finnish television personality and singer

References

Finnish-language surnames
Surnames of Finnish origin